Garmurt may refer to:

Garmurt-e Nosrati
Garmurt-e Ramazanabad